Clavaria pampaeana is a species of fungus belonging to the family Clavariaceae. Growing in open soil, it is shaped like a small white club, growing in scattered groups or sometimes fused. The stem may appear translucent near the base.

Clavaria vermicularis is similar but usually larger.

References

Clavariaceae
Taxa named by Carlo Luigi Spegazzini
Fungi described in 1881